Mr. & Mrs. Bridge is a 1990 American drama film based on the novels by Evan S. Connell of the same name. It is directed by James Ivory, with a screenplay by Ruth Prawer Jhabvala, and produced by Ismail Merchant.

The film stars real-life couple Paul Newman and Joanne Woodward as Mr. and Mrs. Bridge. The character of Mrs. Bridge is based on Connell's mother, Ruth Connell.

Plot
The story of a traditionally minded family living in the Country Club District of Kansas City, Missouri, during the 1930s and 1940s. The Bridges grapple with changing mores and expectations. Mr. Bridge (Paul Newman) is a lawyer who resists his children's rebellion against the conservative values he holds dear. Mrs. Bridge (Joanne Woodward) labors to maintain a Pollyanna view of the world, against her husband's emotional distance and her children's eagerness to adopt a world view more modern than her own.

Cast
 Paul Newman as Walter Gene Bridge
 Joanne Woodward as India Bridge
 Margaret Welsh as Carolyn Bridge, daughter of India and Walter
 Kyra Sedgwick as Ruth Bridge, daughter of India and Walter
Robert Sean Leonard as Douglas Bridge, son of Walter and India
 Simon Callow as Dr. Alex Sauer, psychiatrist
 Remak Ramsay as Virgil Barron, Grace's husband
 Blythe Danner as Grace Barron, India's best friend
 Austin Pendleton as Mr. Gadbury, India's art instructor
 Gale Garnett as Mabel Ong, India's Friend
 Saundra McClain as Harriet Rogers, maid for the Bridge family
 Diane Kagan as Julia, Walter's secretary
 Robyn Rosenfeld as Genevieve, Dr. Sauer's girlfriend
 Marcus Giamatti as Gil Davis, Carolyn's husband
 Melissa Newman as Young India at the pool

Production
Joanne Woodward read the first of Mr. Connell's two novels when it was published in 1959, and for many years she hoped to adapt it into a television production. Originally, she did not intend to play the character of Mrs. Bridge due to the difference in age, but by the late 1980s, when developing the project proved difficult, that was no longer the case.

After a dinner at which James Ivory met the Newmans for the very first time, they decided to adapt the books into a feature-length film. After a script was finished, Paul Newman agreed to play Mr. Bridge which brought in enough financing to shoot the film.

Estimated at $7.5 million, with $500,000 immediately earmarked on interest payments for loans, it was considered a very modest budget, but it also granted Merchant and Ivory the freedom to make the film as they wished. The entire crew took very low salaries while Newman and Woodward both took much lower salaries than they were usually accustomed to.

With the exception of a scene in Paris and another which took advantage of a Toronto snowfall, Mr. & Mrs. Bridge was shot entirely in Kansas City, Missouri on the same streets that Connell would have traveled as a child and teenager. No sound stages were used as real houses, auditoriums and office buildings were all used as sets. The residence used as the Bridge home is just a block west of Loose Park on W. 54th St. There's also a scene set in the vault of the old First National Bank; now the Central Library, the very same vault has been repurposed as the Stanley H. Durwood Film Vault.
Much of the film was shot out of sequence as a way of saving money. For example, when they filmed the law office of Mr. Bridge over one single morning, they changed the furniture and Newman's makeup and clothes every hour as the scenes jumped through the spring of 1932, the fall of 1938, the winter of 1945, and the summer of 1938.

Budget constraints also prevented the art department from renting their set dressings, forcing them to rely on loans and donations. Brunschwig & Fils donated $100,000 worth of fabrics and wallpaper, Glen Raven Mills of North Carolina donated period awning material, and Benjamin Moore donated 100 gallons of paint. A local law firm loaned a dozen Tiffany lamps and paintings by Kansas City artists of the 1930s. Merchant himself borrowed bridge tables from a local society woman and a desk used by the founder of Hallmark greeting cards from his son, who was then head of the company.

According to production designer David Gropman, the Bridges' home was filled with the personal belongings of the Connell family, with Evan Connell's sister, Barbara Zimmermann, loaning all of her porcelain, her whole collection of silver, her Christmas tree ornaments and her coffee urn. A lamp Evan Connell made as a boy can be seen in the bedroom of Douglas Bridge while marble bookends that used to belong to Evan Connell's father were used to dress the law office of Mr. Bridge.

The costume designer Carol Ramsey also had to borrow the production's entire wardrobe, including $4,000 worth of sashes, merit badges, handcarved neckerchief slides and Boy Scout pins from 1938 for Douglas Bridge's Eagle Scout ceremony. The London tailors Gieves & Hawkes agreed to make the entire wardrobe for the film's male characters in return for a screen credit.

A native of Klamath Falls, Oregon, Ivory would tell The New York Times that "the world of Mr. and Mrs. Bridge is the world I grew up in...It's the only film I've ever made that was about my own childhood and adolescence. When we talked about it, that seemed true of Paul and Joanne, too. We talked a lot about manners, about the way things used to be done."

When Ivory was honored by the Houston Cinema Arts Festival in 2014, he presented Mr. & Mrs. Bridge as a personal favorite, adding that it was the one film he would most like to see reappraised. "It had a wonderful story, great script and fabulous acting. So the fact that it was not as well received as some of the others was disappointing. Maybe there is something inherently depressing for Americans to think about, to look carefully at Mr. and Mrs. Bridge. When it was released we had focus groups after the film. And there was a gap of at least a couple of generations between the audiences and the family Connell had written about. People couldn't understand why Mrs. Bridges was acting the way she did, because they didn't know what American life was like in the 1930s and '40s."

Reception
Jonathan Rosenbaum of The Chicago Reader wrote, "I'm not much of a James Ivory fan, but this 1990 adaptation of Evan S. Connell's novels deserves to be seen and cherished for at least a couple of reasons: first for Joanne Woodward's exquisitely multilayered and nuanced performance, and second for screenwriter Ruth Prawer Jhabvala's retention of much of the episodic, short-chapter form of the books. It's true that she and Ivory have toned down many of the darker aspects, but as [The Village Voice] critic Georgia Brown has suggested, Woodward's humanization of her character actually improves on the original. Connell's imagination and compassion regarding this character have their limits, and Woodward triumphantly exceeds them."

Vincent Canby of The New York Times praised the film, calling it "a vigorous, witty, satiric attempt to give dramatic shape to two aggressively anti-dramatic prose works." He also commended Paul Newman and Joanne Woodward for "the most adventurous, most stringent performances of their careers," observing that "there is a reserve, humor and desperation in their characterizations that enrich the very self-conscious flatness of the narrative terrain around them."

Rotten Tomatoes gives the film a rating of 81% from 16 reviews.

Awards and nominations

References

External links
 
 
 

1990 films
1990s English-language films
1990 drama films
American drama films
Films directed by James Ivory
Films set in Missouri
Films shot in Missouri
Merchant Ivory Productions films
Films with screenplays by Ruth Prawer Jhabvala
Films shot in Ottawa
Alliance Atlantis films
Films based on multiple works
1990s American films
English-language drama films